Antonio Allocca (24 June 1937 – 31 December 2013) was an Italian character actor.

Life and career

Born in  Portici, Naples, Allocca debuted on stage in 1956, then in 1958 he worked with Eduardo De Filippo at the Piccolo Teatro in Milan in the comedy play Pulcinella in cerca della sua fortuna per Napoli. In 1962 he made his television debut in Ditegli sempre di sì and Napoli Milionaria, both directed by De Filippo.

Very active both on stage and in films mainly in character roles, Allocca enjoyed a late success as in 1988, with the role of the professor of Italian in the three seasons of the Italia 1 television series I ragazzi della 3ª C. 
 
Allocca died on 31 December 2013, aged 76, in Marcianise, Campania, Italy.

Selected filmography

1974: Farfallon - Galeotto
1975: Dracula in the Provinces - Peppino
1975: Duck in Orange Sauce - Carmine
1978: Flatfoot in Africa - Receptionist
1979: Christ Stopped at Eboli - Don Cosimino
1980: Café Express - Califano
1981: Carcerato - Pasqualino aka Fascination
1981: Fracchia la belva umana - Ufficiale dei Carabinieri
1981: Prima che sia troppo presto
1982: Sogni mostruosamente proibiti - La Manna
1982: Tradimento
1982: Giuramento - Pasqualino
1983: Bonnie and Clyde Italian Style - The Doctor
1983: Pappa e ciccia - Pino - the chauffeur (first story)
1983: Fantozzi subisce ancora - Negoziante di animali
1983: Il ras del quartiere
1984: Where's Picone?
1984: Così parlò Bellavista - Core 'ngrato
1984: Aurora (TV Movie) - Taxi Driver
1986: Scuola di ladri - Facoltoso contadino di Caserta
1986: Italian Fast Food - Esecutore giudiziario
1987: Quel ragazzo della curva B
1987-1989: I ragazzi della 3ª C (TV Series) - Professore di Italiano
1988: 32 dicembre - Il merciaio (segment "I penultimi fuochi")
1988: Casa mia, casa mia... - Judge
1988: Operazione pappagallo
1988: Fantozzi va in pensione - Esaminatore del concorso
1989: I Won the New Year's Lottery - Rossi
1990: Fantozzi alla riscossa
1991: Le comiche 2 - Maggiordomo
1992: Saint Tropez, Saint Tropez - Policeman
1993: Ci hai rotto papà - Umberto Tiberi
1994: Le nuove comiche - Orchestra conductor
1995: Love Story with Cramps - Proprietario della pemsione
1995: Croce e delizia - Jean Fumée
1996: Fantozzi - Il ritorno
1997: A spasso nel tempo – L'avventura continua - Don Peppino
1999: Tifosi - Zio Gaetano
1999: Vacanze sulla neve - Nicolino
1999: Pazzo d'amore - Peppino Gargiulo
2001: E adesso sesso - Portiere d'albergo
2003: Un posto al sole

References

External links

1937 births
2013 deaths
People from the Province of Naples
Italian male television actors
Italian male film actors
Italian male stage actors
20th-century Italian male actors
21st-century Italian male actors